Handball has been a South American Games event since 2002 in São Bernardo do Campo, Brazil. In addition to crowning the handball champions of the South American Games, the tournament also serves as a qualifying tournament for the Pan American Games.

Men

Summary

Medal table

Participating nations

Women

Summary

Medal table

Participating nations

References
 www.panamhandball.org

 
South American Games
South American Games
Handball